COMSA was a Spanish railway infrastructure and construction company.

COMSA or Comsa may also refer to:

 Canadian Osteopathic Medical Student Association
 Compañía Occidental Mexicana S.A, a mining compmany
 Dimitrie Comșa (1846-1931), Transylvanian Romanian agronomer and activist
 Grigorie Comșa (1889–1935), a bishop in the Romanian Orthodox Church
 The "College of Maritime and Shipping Administration" at the Palompon Institute of Technology in the Philippines

See also 
 CONSA, Colegio Nuestra Señora de la Altagracia
 Cosma (disambiguation)
 Komsa (disambiguation)